James Husband may refer to:
 James Husband (music project), the recording project of James Huggins III, Of Montreal's multi-instrumentalist
 James Husband (footballer) (born 1994), English footballer
 Jimmy Husband (born 1947), English footballer